Rastamouse is a stop motion animated children's television series created by Genevieve Webster and Michael De Souza and produced by Three Stones Media/The Rastamouse Company and DHX Media for CBeebies. The show follows crime busting mouse reggae band Da Easy Crew, who split their time between making music and solving mysteries for the President of Mouseland.

The first 52 episodes of the initial series were shown in the afternoon beginning 31 January 2011 on CBeebies, a UK BBC channel. From 7 March 2011, the programme was repeated in the early mornings, on BBC2. The second series, comprising a further 26 episodes, started on 20 August 2012. The third series, comprising the final 26 episodes, began on CBeebies 23 March 2015.

Characters 

The series features an all-mouse reggae band, Rastamouse and Da Easy Crew, who play music at the 'Nuff Song Studio' when they're not solving mysteries for the President of Mouseland. All the characters speak with a Jamaican accent.

 Rastamouse: Crime fighting mouse and lead guitar player for Da Easy Crew. Always knows how to "make a bad ting good." His catchphrase is "Irie, man!"
 Scratchy: DJ and bass player for Da Easy Crew. Her catchphrases are "Sweet!" and "You know what I'm saying!"
 Zoomer: Speediest mouse in Mouseland, bongo player in Da Easy Crew. His catchphrase is "Aww, man!"
 Wensley Dale: President of Mouseland. He calls Da Easy Crew on his transistor radio when there's a mystery that needs solving.
 Bagga T: Hip-hop rapper mouse who looks after the orphanage. His catchphrase is "Me name's Bagga T, double trouble, double G!”.
 Missy D: Dancer. Runs the dance studio.
 Bandulu: Expert chef mouse who cooks at the orphanage. His specialty is cheese pies.
 Fats: Mechanic who runs Fats' 4x4 Garage.
 Mixie: Bagga T's cousin and beatboxer.
 Natty Kass: Super stylish fashion designer.
 Sasha: Wensley Dale's older sister. She's super tidy, but a little bit bossy.
 Frank: Wensley Dale's nephew. He's a skateboarding artist mouse, who's a bit clumsy and stutters.
 Aunt Janessa: Wensley Dale's aunt. Singer who runs the Mouseland Choir.
 Lil' Patch: Operates Mouseland's famous radio station, 'For Real FM'.
 Super: Owns and runs a supermarket. 
 Half Pint: Delivery mouse. 
 Ron: The Grovetown barber.
 Stylus: Owns the record store.
 Toots: Lead singer of The Mousetails.
 Ice Popp: Rapper and Toots' roadie.
 Orphans: Baby mice who live in the orphanage.
 Spike Cheez: World-famous filmmaker and director.

Cast (voice actors) 

 Rastamouse: Reggie Yates
 Scratchy: Sharon Duncan-Brewster
 Zoomer: William Vanderpuye
 President Wensley Dale: Cornell John

Origins 
Rastamouse first appeared in 2004 in the children's books Rastamouse and the Crucial Plan and Rastamouse Da Bag-a Bling. A third book, Rastamouse and the Double-Crossin' Diva, was published in 2005. The stories were co-written by Genevieve Webster, an author and illustrator, and Michael De Souza, a Rastafarian swimming instructor. They are written in rhyme and contain a Caribbean accent and some Jamaican Patois terms. A pop song, "Ice Popp", was released in 2011.

Lenny Henry read two of the stories, The Crucial Plan and Da Bag-a Bling, for the BBC's Jackanory Junior, which was first shown in January 2008.

Ethos 
The stories emphasise the importance of solving problems through mutual understanding, love and respect, without resorting to punishment. Rastamouses ethos is redemption and not retribution — "make a bad ting good" — helping wrong-doers to redeem themselves from their mistakes. Meaning good things can come from bad things.

Music
Rastamouse and Da Easy Crew's album Makin' A Bad Ting Good was released by EMI in July 2011. It includes the single "Ice Popp". A full second album of original music, Best Friends, was released by the Demon Music Group sublabel Little Demon on 24 June 2016. The lead single of the album was "Mi Love Mi Music". All music for the series was composed by Andrew Kingslow. The theme tune was sung by Martin "Sugar" Merchant, former singer in the rock/reggae band Audioweb. Reggae with medium to heavy base.

Puppets 
The puppets were made by Mackinnon and Saunders, who previously made the puppets for Bob the Builder, Postman Pat and Tim Burton's Corpse Bride. The puppets are 5 mouse.

Critical reception 
There was early speculation in the British media that the Rastamouse cheese was an allusion to marijuana, despite actual cheese being shown in the series.

The Voice, a newspaper that serves the British African-Caribbean community, welcomed the show, albeit as a stereotype of Jamaican life: a The Voice website poll showed that over 60% considered it to be a positive programme. Digital Spy commented that the BBC said that "Rastamouse is not racist". The Guardian newspaper gave a differing view of Rastamouse, with the producer Greg Boardman stating that the producers "never intentionally put in innuendo or anything that isn't age-appropriate".

Figures provided by broadcast regulator Ofcom indicate that the animated TV show received 12 complaints in 2011, though none of them were upheld. The BBC described Rastamouse, aimed at children under six, as one of its most popular shows of 2011.

The series was nominated for the British Academy Children's Award for Pre-School Animation twice, in 2011 and 2012.

Episodes: Series I

Episodes: Series II

Episodes: Series III

Live performances

In June 2011, Rastamouse performed a series of shows in the Kidz Field at Glastonbury Festival.

They also performed in 2011 on English breakfast show Daybreak.

On 13 March 2015, Rastamouse & Da Easy Crew took part in Dermot's Day of Dance for Red Nose Day 2015.

All Tings Rastamouse Shop
On 28 February 2015, the world's first official Rastamouse shop was opened by co-author Michael de Souza, in Peckham, South London.

References

External links
 Rastamouse official site
 
 
 
 BBC Wales: Interview with Aron Evans, managing director of Dinamo
 The whole catalog is available to stream at qkids.com and the Qkids app in the iTunes Store.

Animated television series about mice and rats
2011 British television series debuts
2015 British television series endings
2010s British animated television series
2010s British children's television series
2011 Canadian television series debuts
2015 Canadian television series endings
2010s Canadian animated television series
2010s Canadian children's television series
BBC children's television shows
British children's animated comedy television series
British children's animated musical television series
British children's animated mystery television series
British preschool education television series
British stop-motion animated television series
British television shows based on children's books
Canadian children's animated comedy television series
Canadian children's animated musical television series
Canadian children's animated mystery television series
Canadian preschool education television series
Canadian stop-motion animated television series
Canadian television shows based on children's books
Children's television characters
Jamaican culture
Television series by DHX Media
Television series by Sony Pictures Television
CBeebies
Animated preschool education television series
2010s preschool education television series
English-language television shows